The 2009–10 Ulster Rugby season was Ulster's 16th season since the advent of professionalism in rugby union, and their first under director of rugby David Humphreys and head coach Brian McLaughlin. 

Following the departure of previous head coach Matt Williams, Ulster put a new management structure in place. David Humphreys was director of rugby, with overall responsibility for the senior team, the Ulster 'A' team (renamed the Ulster Ravens), the Ulster under-20s and the academy; and Brian McLaughlin was head coach, assisted by forwards coaches Jeremy Davidson and Peter Sharp, and backs coach Neil Doak. However, Ulster couldn't afford to retain Sharp, and he left in September 2009.

Chief Executive Michael Reid announced he was stepping down in September 2009 after twelve years in the job. Shane Logan was appointed as his replacement in early 2010.

They finished second in their Heineken Cup pool, failing to qualify for the knockout stage, and 8th in the Celtic League. Chris Henry was Ulster's Player of the Year. Andrew Trimble won the IRUPA award for Try of the Year.

Staff

Squad

Senior squad

Players in (Season 2009/2010)
  Tamaiti Horua from Western Force
  Andi Kyriacou from Saracens
  Dan Tuohy from Exeter Chiefs

Players Out (Season 2009/2010)
  Jarleth Carey, released
  Kieron Dawson, released
  Carlo Del Fava to Rugby Viadana
  Rob Dewey to Glasgow Warriors
  Neil Hanna, released
  Seamus Mallon, released
  Paul McKenzie to Exeter Chiefs
  Stuart Philpott, released

Academy squad

Heineken Cup

Pool 4

Celtic League

Ulster Ravens

British and Irish Cup

Pool C

Semi-final

Home attendance

Ulster Rugby Awards
The Ulster Rugby Awards ceremony was held on 20 May 2010. Winners were:

Ulster Rugby Personality of the Year: Chris Henry
Rugby Writers Player of the Year: Chris Henry
Supporters Club Player of the Year: Chris Henry
Ulster Player of the Year: Andrew Trimble
Young Ulster Player of the Year: Jamie Smith
Youth Player of the Year: Jonathan Murphy, Banbridge RFC
Schools Player of the Year: Charlie Simpson, Ballymena Academy
Academy Player of the Year: Nevin Spence
Club of the Year: Ballymoney RFC
Dorrington B. Faulker Award: Hal Burnison, Malone RFC
Club Player of the Year: Mark Robinson, Queen's University RFC
Special Merit Award: Joe Eagleson, Honorary Secretary of the IRFU Ulster Branch

References

2009-10
2009–10 in Irish rugby union
2009–10 Celtic League by team
2009–10 Heineken Cup by team